Roulette Stars of Metro Detroit is an American mockumentary film starring members of the rock band Electric Six as fictional versions of themselves. The film was written by lead singer Dick Valentine and was crowd-sourced through a Kickstarter campaign.

Cast

 Dick Valentine as himself
 Da Ve as himself
  as himself
 Tait Nucleus? as himself
 Mike Alonso as himself

Production

The project was originally pitched on Kickstarter as a spoof 45-minute pilot for a documentary TV series following fictionalised backstories and exploits of the members of the band.

A $30,000 goal was set which was soon reached and surpassed. A total of $63,243 was raised by the end of the campaign.

The mockumentary features cameos from some backers of the project on Kickstarter who pledged to be given a role in the film.

During the edit, it was decided to alter production and produce a feature-film mockumentary with the footage instead. The finished product runs for 85 minutes.

The project was distributed to its backers on the 14th of July 2016. A public screening was held at the Main Art Theatre in Detroit on the 8th of September 2016 and it was subsequently accepted into the Royal Starr Film Festival and screened publicly on the 15th of October 2016.

As with previous Kickstarter campaigns run by the band, the option was given to pledge money in exchange for choosing a song that the band would cover to potentially appear in the film and to feature on the soundtrack. None of these made their way into the final cut but are all present on the soundtrack.

Soundtrack album
The film's soundtrack album was released on CD and digital download to the project's Kickstarter pledgers. It is the band's thirteenth studio album, comprising four original songs, three covers and two remixes of the band's songs.

The covers and remixes don't appear in the film despite being present on the album. Conversely, the film makes use of the songs "Dance Commander", "Night Vision", "Infected Girls", "Down at McDonnelzzz", "Gay Bar Part Two", "Eye Contact", "I'm the Devil, "Kids Are Evil", "Roulette!" and "Dime, Dime, Penny Dime" from previous Electric Six albums with none of them appearing on the soundtrack.

The band subsequently performed a stripped down, acoustic version of the song "An Omen of Things to Come" on their third live album Chill Out!

Personnel
 Dick Valentine - vocals
 Tait Nucleus? - synthesizer (tracks 3, 6, 7), guitar (track 3), drum programming (track 6)
  - guitar, background vocals (tracks 1-3), keyboards (tracks 1-2, 4, 9), bass (tracks 2-3, 6-8), drum programming (tracks 4, 8-9), drums (tracks 8-9)
 Percussion World - drums (tracks 2-3, 6)
 Da Ve - guitar (track 3)
 Scott Weinert - bass (track 1)
 Steven Powell - cajón (track 1)
 Melody Malosh - background vocals (track 3)
 Nicole Tausney - background vocals (track 3)
 Coaimhe Carton - vocals (track 4)

Dick Valentine Raw Collection
One of the rewards offered as part of the project's Kickstarter campaign was the Dick Valentine Raw Collection, a compilation album of demos and other pieces produced by Electric Six frontman Dick Valentine.

All tracks written by Tyler Spencer.

References

External links
 

2016 films
American independent films
American mockumentary films
2010s English-language films
2010s American films